"On Murder Considered as one of the Fine Arts" is an essay by Thomas De Quincey first published in 1827 in Blackwood's Magazine. The essay is a fictional, satirical account of an address made to a gentleman's club concerning the aesthetic appreciation of murder. It focuses particularly on a series of murders allegedly committed in 1811 by John Williams in the neighborhood of Ratcliffe Highway, London. The essay was enthusiastically received and led to numerous sequels, including "A Second Paper on Murder Considered as one of the Fine Arts" in 1839 and a "Postscript" in 1854. These essays have exerted a strong influence on subsequent literary representations of crime and were lauded by such critics as G. K. Chesterton, Wyndham Lewis and George Orwell.

De Quincey also refers to the Williams murders in his "On the Knocking at the Gate in Macbeth".

The 1964 French film On Murder Considered as One of the Fine Arts takes its name from the essay.

References

External links

1827 essays
Works by Thomas De Quincey
English essays
Works originally published in Blackwood's Magazine